Lega is a river in Poland, a right tributary of the river Biebrza.  It flows through a number of lakes on the border of the Warmian-Masurian and Podlaskie Voivodeships. Its source is near the village of Szarejki.

Geography 
It passes through the Great Olecko Lake and the Small Olecko Lake at Olecko, and flows into the lake Selmęt Wielki east of Ełk. It continues to the lake Stackie, which is connected with the lake Rajgrodzkie, under the name Małkiń. It flows out of Rajgrodzkie at Rajgród, and continues under the name Jegrznia. It passes through the lake Dręstwo and flows into the Biebrza near Goniądz.

Rivers of Poland
Rivers of Podlaskie Voivodeship
Rivers of Warmian-Masurian Voivodeship